Pedro Humberto Allende Sarón (July 29, 1885 – August 17, 1959) was one of the most important Chilean composers of the twentieth century. He obtained the prestigious Premio Nacional de Arte in 1945.

Biography 
Allende was born on July 29, 1885 in Santiago.  His first contact with music was due to his older brother, Juan, who became a professor at the National Conservatory of Chile. Allende himself later enrolled there and studied with Agustín Reyes, Aurelio Silva, Carlos Debuysère, Domenico Brescia, Luis Esteban Giarda y Federico Stöber, from whom he learned music theory, violin, piano, cello, harmony, counterpoint, fugue and composition.  In 1908, he graduated, having specialized in harmony, composition, violin, and song, and obtained a professorship. Two years later he was the prize winner at the musical concourse of the Centenary of Chile.

In 1911, he traveled to Europe, with a grant from the Chilean government, to perfect his musical knowledge. He visited Portugal, Spain, Italy, Switzerland, Germany, the Netherlands, and Belgium. On his return, he suggested certain reforms that were introduced in the National Conservatory. He soon made another trip to Europe, giving lectures on music in Germany, Spain, and France.

He had a long, respected career both as a composer and as a professor at the National Conservatory in Chile. His compositions drew inspiration from Chilean folk themes as well as the music of the Mapuche. His music was appreciated by noted composers worldwide, and he received letters of admiration from Claude Debussy, Florent Schmitt, and Federico Mompou. His best known works are:
La Voz de las Calles
Doce Tonadas para Piano
Concierto para violoncello y orquesta

References

External links 
 

1885 births
1959 deaths
20th-century classical composers
Chilean composers
Chilean male composers
People from Santiago
Male classical composers
20th-century male musicians